Josip Crnić (born January 11, 1989) is a Croatian handball right winger.

Club career
Crnić started his senior career in local premier league club Zamet. He would soon leave and spend two year at Perutnina Pipo IPC from Međimurje. In 2011 he returned to his youth club RK Kozala helping them earn promotion from 2.HRL to 1.HRL.

From 2011 to 2013 he played both for Kozala in the 1.HRL and for Siscia in the Dukat Premier League.

In 2013 he went into retirement due to job obligations.

He came out of retirement in 2014 and signed to RK Nexe Našice.

In July 2016 it was announced that Crnić had moved to German club OHV Aurich.

International career
Crnić played for the Croatia U-18 and Croatia U-19 national team.

Honours
Zamet
Croatian Handball Championship U-18 Runner-up (1): 2008

Kozala
2.HRL Runner-up (1): 2011-12

NEXE Našice
Dukat Premier League Runner-up (2): 2014-15, 2015–16
Croatian Cup 
Runner-up (1): 2015
Third (1): 2016

Individual
Dražen Petrović Award - 2007

References

External links
Josip Crnić eurohandball profile

Croatian male handball players
1989 births
Living people
Handball players from Rijeka
Croatian expatriate sportspeople in Germany